Garsten-St. Ulrich Hydroelectric Power Station is a run-of-the-river hydroelectric power station on the Enns. It is located in Garsten municipality, state of Upper Austria, Austria.

Construction of the power station began in 1965. It was operational in 1967. Garsten-St. Ulrich is owned and operated by Ennskraftwerke AG.

Dam 
Garsten-St. Ulrich dam consists of a weir with 3 sluice gates on the left side and a machine hall (length 50 m, width 48,2 m, height 36,5 m) on the right side.

Reservoir
The dam creates a small reservoir.

Power station 
The power station contains 3 Kaplan turbine-generators, two with 15.5 MW each and one with 1.943 MW. The total nameplate capacity is 35.3 MW. Its average annual generation is 157 GWh. The turbines were provided by Andritz and Escher Wyss; the generators by ELIN and Wiener Starkstromwerke.

The maximum hydraulic head is 13.3 m. The maximum flow for all turbines is 286 m³/s.

References

External links 

 

Dams in Austria
Hydroelectric power stations in Austria
Gravity dams
Dams completed in 1967
Energy infrastructure completed in 1967
1967 establishments in Austria
Economy of Upper Austria
20th-century architecture in Austria